Poecilognathus punctipennis is a species of bee flies (insects in the family Bombyliidae).

References

Further reading

External links

 
 

Bombyliidae
Insects described in 1849